"No More Lies" is the debut single by American R&B artist Michel'le. It was released in 1989 as the lead single from her self-titled debut album, and became a top 10 hit in the US.

Composition
The Washington Post speculated that "No More Lies" was written about Michel'le's then-boyfriend Dr. Dre, who was abusive toward her and notoriously unfaithful.

Music video
A music video for the song was released. It depicted Michel'le at a dinner party, singing and dancing while interacting with the guests.

Commercial performance
"No More Lies" was a top 10 hit in the US, reaching number 7 on the Billboard Hot 100 and number 2 on the Hot R&B/Hip-Hop Songs chart (behind "It's Gonna Be Alright" by Ruby Turner and "Where Do We Go from Here" by Stacy Lattisaw and Johnny Gill, neither of which entered the Hot 100). The song was certified gold by the RIAA less than a year after its release. The song remains her most successful single, though "Nicety" and "Something in My Heart" were also top 40 hits in the US.

Track listings

US promotional CD single
"No More Lies" (LP Version) — 3:45
"No More Lies" (Extended Dance Mix) — 6:20
"No More Lies" (More Lies Version) — 1:50
"No More Lies" (Instrumental) — 3:55

US cassette
"No More Lies" — 3:42
"Never Been in Love" — 3:41

US 7"
A. "No More Lies" — 3:42
B. "Never Been in Love" — 3:41

Japan mini-CD single
"No More Lies" — 3:42
"Never Been in Love" — 3:41

Charts

Certifications

References

External links
View the Music Video

1989 debut singles
1989 songs
Songs about infidelity
Michel'le songs
Song recordings produced by Dr. Dre
Ruthless Records singles
Songs written by Dr. Dre
Atco Records singles
Atlantic Records singles